Bosse is both a surname and a given name. Notable people with the name include:

Surname
 Abraham Bosse (c. 1600–1676), French artist
 Chris Bosse (born 1971), German architect
 Gustav Bosse (1884-1943), German music publisher
 Hans Bosse (born 1938), German sociologist and ethnologist
 Harriet Bosse (1878–1961), Swedish actress
 Henry Peter Bosse (1844–1903), German American photographer
 Malcolm Bosse (1926–2002), American author
 Pierre-Ambroise Bosse (born 1992), French athlete
 Käte Bosse-Griffiths (1910–1998), German Egyptologist and Welsh language writer
 Lili Bosse, current Mayor of Beverly Hills, California
 Walter Bosse (1904–1979), a Viennese artist, designer, ceramist, potter, metalworker, and craftsman noted for his modernist bronze animal figurines and grotesques.

Given name
Bosse Ringholm (born 1942), Swedish politician

Normally it is a nick name of Bo.

Swedish masculine given names